Rollin Wayne "Rollie" Prather (July 17, 1925 – May 28, 1996) was a Canadian football player who played for the Edmonton Eskimos. He won the Grey Cup with them in 1954. Born in Eureka, Kansas, the son of Raymond Lealand and Irene (Bailey) Prather, he previously played football at and attended Kansas State University, graduating with a Bachelor of Science degree in geology. In 1980, Prather was working as a geologist and served as vice-president of Columbia Gas Development of Canada, Ltd., residing in Edmonton. Prather died at his home in Calgary in 1996.

References

1925 births
1996 deaths
Edmonton Elks players
People from Eureka, Kansas
Players of American football from Kansas
Kansas State Wildcats football players